Sylvia Jeanne Alice Karres (born 8 November 1976 in Leiderdorp) is a retired Dutch field hockey player who played as an attacker for Dutch club Amsterdam. She also played for the Netherlands national team.

Karres was a member of the Dutch squad that won the silver medal at the 2004 Summer Olympics in Athens. She was also part of the Dutch squad that became world champions at the 2006 Women's Hockey World Cup, where she was the top goal scorer of the tournament with 6 goals.

External links
 
 Profile
 Dutch Hockey Federation
 Dutch Olympic Committee

1976 births
Living people
Dutch female field hockey players
Field hockey players at the 2004 Summer Olympics
Medalists at the 2004 Summer Olympics
Olympic field hockey players of the Netherlands
Olympic medalists in field hockey
Olympic silver medalists for the Netherlands
People from Leiderdorp
Sportspeople from South Holland
20th-century Dutch women
21st-century Dutch women